György Rehus-Uzor (10 July 1946 – 20 August 2020) was a Hungarian weightlifter. He competed in the men's middle heavyweight event at the 1976 Summer Olympics, finishing in fourth place.

References

External links
 

1946 births
2020 deaths
Hungarian male weightlifters
Olympic weightlifters of Hungary
Weightlifters at the 1976 Summer Olympics
Sportspeople from Budapest
20th-century Hungarian people